Munich North is an electoral constituency (German: Wahlkreis) represented in the Bundestag. It elects one member via first-past-the-post voting. Under the current constituency numbering system, it is designated as constituency 217. It is located in southern Bavaria, comprising the northern part of the city of Munich.

Munich North was created for the inaugural 1949 federal election. Since 2017, it has been represented by Bernhard Loos of the Christian Social Union (CSU).

Geography
Munich North is located in southern Bavaria. As of the 2021 federal election, it comprises the boroughs of Maxvorstadt (3), Schwabing-West (4), Moosach (10), Milbertshofen-Am Hart (11), Schwabing-Freimann (12), and Feldmoching-Hasenbergl (24) from the independent city of Munich.

History
Munich North was created in 1949. In the 1949 election, it was Bavaria constituency 5 in the numbering system. In the 1953 through 1961 elections, it was number 200. In the 1965 through 1976 elections, it was number 205. In the 1980 through 1998 elections, it was number 204. In the 2002 and 2005 elections, it was number 219. In the 2009 and 2013 elections, it was number 218. Since the 2017 election, it has been number 217.

Originally, the constituency comprised the boroughs of Schwabing, Freimann, Milbertshofen, Moosach, Feldmoching, Hasenbergl, Maxvorstadt, and Lehel. In the 1965 through 1972 elections, it comprised the boroughs of Schwabing-Ost, Freimann, Milbertshofen, Moosach, Feldmoching, Hasenbergl, and Neuhausen. In the 1976 election, it lost the Neuhausen borough. It acquired its current borders in the 2002 election.

Members
The constituency was first represented by Walter Seuffert of the Social Democratic Party (SPD) from 1949 to 1953. Otto Gumrum of the Christian Social Union (CSU) was elected in 1953 and served a single term. Siegfried Balke of the CSU then served from 1957 to 1965. Former member Seuffert won the constituency in 1965 and served one term. He was succeeded by fellow SPD member Wenzel Bredl from 1969 to 1976. Former mayor of Munich Hans-Jochen Vogel of the SPD was representative from 1976 to 1983. Fritz Wittmann won the constituency for the CSU in 1983, and served until 1994. Johannes Singhammer of the CSU served one term from 1994 to 1998. Axel Berg of the SPD was elected in 1998, and was representative until 2009. Former member Singhammer of the CSU won the constituency for in 2009 and served until 2017. Bernhard Loos of the CSU was elected in 2017 and re-elected in 2021.

Election results

2021 election

2017 election

2013 election

2009 election

References

Federal electoral districts in Bavaria
1949 establishments in West Germany
Constituencies established in 1949
Munich